Avicenna International College – AIC – (Hungarian: Avicenna Nemzetközi Kollégium) was founded in 1995 by Dr. Shahrokh Mirza Hosseini and has been in operation as a preparatory college for higher education since 2000. The college offers foundation programs in medicine, business, technical studies, and English, as well as preparatory programs for Masters and PhD studies.

History
The predecessor to Avicenna International College was founded in 1995 and the college launched its first academic year in 2000. Since then, more than 3,000 students have successfully completed one of the institution’s preparatory programs.

In 2003, AIC established its International Advisory Board. The Advisory Board supervises and supports the educational activities and programs of the college. It observes and evaluates the educational plans and strategies, and advises the college officers on development of the quality management system.

In 2004, AIC opened the Avicenna Residential Complex for the college's growing international student population.

During 2006 and 2007, the institution got its accreditation in Hungary and Iran, and since 2007, the Swedish governmental student agency recognizes AIC as well.

In 2006, AIC started a scholarship program to give aid to those students who have financial problems.

International Advisory Board
Avicenna’s advisory board was founded in 2003, and has since helped the institution’s work.

President:

Prof. Emer. Dr. Béla Halász

Semmelweis University (Department of Human Morphology and Developmental Biology)

Secretary:

Prof. Dr. László Rosivall, Deputy Director

Semmelweis University (Department of Pathophysiology)

Members:

Prof. Dr. György Benedek, Dean

University of Szeged (Faculty of General Medicine)

Prof. Dr. Gyula Csopaki, Past Director

Budapest University of Technology and Economics (International Education Center)

Prof. Dr. Kornél Dános, Past Director

Semmelweis University (Language Communication Center)

Prof. Dr. László Kopper, Deputy Rector

Semmelweis University

Prof. Emer. Dr. Emil Monos

Semmelweis University (Institute of Human Physiology and Clinical Experimental Research)

Prof. Dr. Zoltán Szelényi

University of Pécs (Department of Pathophysiology)

Programs
Medical Foundation Program (MFP)

MFP is designed for those students who wish to continue their studies at one of Europe’s medical universities.

Business Foundation Program (BFP)

BFP is intended for those who want to continue their studies in one of the business fields.

Technical Foundation Program (TFP)

TFP is offered for those students who wish to study in one of the technical fields during their university studies.

English Foundation Program (EFP)

EFP is an intensive language education program which ensures that students reach a high level of knowledge. Those who complete this program can successfully pass the IELTS examination.

Pre-PhD Program

This program is designed for those who already have a master's degree and wish to further educate themselves. This program is suitable for those who have a Bachelor degree and would like to complete a Master program as well.

References

External links
 Avicenna International Colleges

Education in Hungary